Wyatt Anthony Hubert (born June 13, 1998) is an American football defensive end who is currently a free agent. He played college football at Kansas State.

Career
Hubert was drafted by the Cincinnati Bengals in the seventh round, 235th overall, of the 2021 NFL Draft. He signed his four-year rookie contract with Cincinnati on May 17. On July 26, 2021, it was announced that Hubert had suffered a torn pectoral in the offseason. He was placed on the reserve/non-football injury list to start the 2021 season. Hubert announced his retirement on August 13, 2022. On February 28, 2023, he announced he was returning to football via Twitter.

References

External links
Kansas State Wildcats bio

Living people
Cincinnati Bengals players
Kansas State Wildcats football players
Players of American football from Kansas
Sportspeople from Topeka, Kansas
1998 births
American football defensive ends